David H. Lillard Jr. (born c. 1953) is an American lawyer, politician and government official. A Republican, he serves as the state treasurer for the state of Tennessee.

Early life
David Lillard was born circa 1953 in Fort Rucker, Alabama. He graduated from the University of Memphis, where he earned a BA and a JD. He earned a master of laws in taxation from the University of Florida in 1983.

Legal career
Lillard was a lawyer for almost three decades. According to the National Association of State Auditors, Comptrollers, and Treasurers, he practiced "tax, securities, municipal finance and health regulatory law."

Political career

County Commissioner
A Republican, Lillard was a Shelby County Commissioner until 2009, was Chairman of the Shelby County Board of Commissioners and also served as president of the Tennessee County Commissioners Association.

State Treasurer
In 2009, after Republicans gained control of the Tennessee General Assembly (the state legislature), the legislature elected Lillard as the Tennessee State Treasurer. He was subsequently re-elected to several two-year terms, most recently in January 2021 and January 2023.

As State Treasurer, Lillard oversees the Tennessee Department of Treasury, which manages the Tennessee Consolidated Retirement System (TCRS), the state's pension fund. The Tennessee Treasury also administers Tennessee's 529 plan for college savings (TNStars); the Tennessee Financial Literacy Commission; ABLE TN; the state Unclaimed Property Division, and the Criminal Injuries Compensation Fund.

In 2014, Lillard worked with the General Assembly on legislation that required newly state employees to contribute to their pensions, creating a "hybrid plan" that reduced costs; the legislation created a 401(k) plan and raised the retirement age to receive full benefits from 60 to 65.

Lillard supported legislation in 2014 that required local governments in Tennessee that do not participate in TCRS to annually fund 100% of the "actuarially determined annual required contribution." The Tennessee General Assembly unanimously passed the legislation in April 2014. Local governments that participated in TCRS were already required to make 100% contributions.

Lillard also served as President of the National Executive Committee of the National Association of State Auditors, Comptrollers and Treasurers (NASACT) through 2017. He is currently a member of the National Association of State Treasurers' Governmental Accounting Standards Advisory Council (GASAC).

Personal life
Lillard has a wife, Patricia Newton, and three children. He resides in Shelby County, and he is a member of the United Methodist Church.

References

1953 births
Living people
People from Fort Rucker, Alabama
People from Shelby County, Tennessee
State treasurers of Tennessee
Tennessee lawyers
Tennessee Republicans
University of Florida alumni
University of Memphis alumni